Marcelo Ribeiro (born 1970) is a Brazilian actor, best known for his role as "the boy" in the movie "Love Strange Love".

In 1981, he was chosen by director Walter Hugo Khouri to participate in "Eros, the God of Love". The following year, the same director wrote "Love Strange Love", a film in which Ribeiro played the pre-adolescent protagonist Hugo alongside Vera Fischer and Xuxa.

After two years, Ribeiro starred in "Sin Horizontal" and after these three films, he did not appear in films, but worked as a film production assistant. In that role, he studied photography and opened a small studio. He is currently a technical and computer instructor at a multinational company. He has started his own website to continue his work.

In 2007, he starred in the pornographic film Estranho Amor directed by J. Gaspar for Brasileirinhas.

Filmography

References

External links

Living people
1970 births
Brazilian male film actors

Brazilian male pornographic film actors